Stomatin-like protein 1 is a protein that in humans is encoded by the STOML1 gene.

References

Further reading